Wen Hui (birth and death years unknown), courtesy name Manji, was an official who lived during the late Eastern Han dynasty and Three Kingdoms period of China. He held various positions under the Han government, including county/commandery administrative offices, Registrar to the Imperial Chancellor, and Inspector of Yang Province. He served as the Administrator of Wei Commandery under the state of Cao Wei during the Three Kingdoms period. In 223, he was promoted to Inspector of Liang Province and Colonel Who Protects the Qiang, but died en route to assuming his new offices.

See also
 Lists of people of the Three Kingdoms

Notes

References

 Chen, Shou (3rd century). Records of the Three Kingdoms (Sanguozhi).
 
 Pei, Songzhi (5th century). Annotations to Records of the Three Kingdoms (Sanguozhi zhu).
 Sima, Guang (1084). Zizhi Tongjian.

Year of birth unknown
Year of death unknown
Officials under Cao Cao
Cao Wei politicians